Pleshavka is a rural locality (a village) in Ilyinskoye Rural Settlement, Kharovsky District, Vologda Oblast, Russia. The population was 13 as of 2002.

Geography 
Pleshavka is located 29 km northeast of Kharovsk (the district's administrative centre) by road. Zolotogorka is the nearest rural locality.

References 

Rural localities in Kharovsky District